In strong-field laser physics, ponderomotive energy is the cycle-averaged quiver energy of a free electron in an electromagnetic field.

Equation 
The ponderomotive energy is given by
,

In terms of the laser intensity , using , it reads less simply:
,

where   is the vacuum permittivity.

For typical orders of magnitudes involved in laser physics, this becomes:

,

The units are electronvolts (eV), watts (W), centimeters (cm) and micrometers (μm).

Atomic units
In atomic units,  where . If one uses the atomic unit of electric field, then the ponderomotive energy is just

Derivation
The formula for the ponderomotive energy can be easily derived. A free particle of charge
 interacts with an electric field . The force on the charged particle is 
.

The acceleration of the particle is 
.

Because the electron executes harmonic motion, the particle's position is 
.

For a particle experiencing harmonic motion, the time-averaged energy is 
.

In laser physics, this is called the ponderomotive energy .

See also
Ponderomotive force
Electric constant
Harmonic generation
List of laser articles

References and notes

Laser science
Energy (physics)